The Yeshua Tova Synagogue ( or Sinagoga Podul Mogoşoaiei) in Bucharest, Romania, is the city's oldest synagogue, serving the local Chabad Jewish community. 

The synagogue is located on 9 Tache Ionescu Street, near Piaţa Amzei and Piața Romană metro station. It was built in 1827 and renovated in 2007. A Moorish architectural influence can be observed on the facade. Bas-reliefs decorate the tympanums above the frontal doors and the upper part of the facade.

See also
 History of the Jews in Romania
 List of synagogues in Romania

External links

  "Sărbătoare la Sinagoga 'Yeshua Tova' cu prilejul inaugurării" , Realitatea Evreiască, January 25–February 25, 2007 

Ashkenazi Jewish culture in Romania
Chabad in Europe
Hasidic Judaism in Romania
Hasidic synagogues
History of Bucharest
Jewish Romanian history
Synagogues in Bucharest
Synagogues completed in 1827
1827 establishments in the Ottoman Empire